Benjamin Whitworth (24 May 1816 – 24 September 1893) was an Irish politician, who represented constituencies in Ireland at the United Kingdom Parliament in Westminster, London.

Early life
Benjamin Whitworth was born in Manchester in 1816.  He came to Drogheda as a child; his father was a corn merchant.

Benjamin was educated in England, and he later went into business himself in Manchester. However he returned to Drogheda, and founded the Greenmount and Boyne Mills in 1865. This factory once employed 1,200 people and exported linen throughout the world.

Parliamentary career
He was returned for Drogheda, as a Liberal, in the 1865 general election. However his 1868 re-election was declared void and he was replaced by his son Thomas Whitworth, in an unopposed by-election on 15 March 1869.

Benjamin Whitworth was elected Member of Parliament for Kilkenny City, in a by-election in 1875. He resigned in 1880 to contest the Drogheda constituency in a by-election as a Home Rule candidate. Elected unopposed in the 1880 general election, he sat as MP until the constituency was abolished in 1885.

Service to Drogheda
He was a major benefactor to the town of Drogheda, overseeing the construction of the public water supply system in the town. In 1865 he built the Whitworth Hall, located on St. Laurence's Street, which he later donated to the people of the town. He helped to build the Christian Brothers monastery, formerly at Sundays Gate. He was awarded the freedom of the Borough in 1877.

Whitworth died in London in 1893 aged 77.

Legacy 
John Porter dedicated his 1876 publication, History of the Fylde of Lancashire, to Whitworth "in admiration of his enterprise, generosity, and philanthropy".

References

Sources
 Parliamentary Election Results in Ireland, 1801-1922, edited by B.M. Walker (Royal Irish Academy 1978)

External links 
 

1816 births
1893 deaths
UK MPs 1868–1874
UK MPs 1874–1880
UK MPs 1880–1885
Members of the Parliament of the United Kingdom for County Louth constituencies (1801–1922)
Members of the Parliament of the United Kingdom for County Kilkenny constituencies (1801–1922)
People from Drogheda
Politicians from County Louth